Sherpa (also known as Sherpa.ai) is a Spanish artificial intelligence company specialized in predictive conversational digital assistants. It was founded by Xabi Uribe-Etxebarria in 2012 and is based in Erandio and Silicon Valley. In 2018, Fortune magazine included it in its ranking of the 100 best artificial intelligence companies.

Trajectory 
The company was created in 2012 with the aim of developing a predictive conversational digital assistant based on artificial intelligence algorithms for different companies, and provide consultancy in artificial intelligence. It is based in Erandio (Vizcaya, Spain) and Silicon Valley (California, United States). In 2016 it obtained 6.5 million dollars in a funding round from Mundi Ventures and other private investors. By 2019 it obtained, in a second round, 8.5 million dollars. Sherpa is ISO/IEC 27001 certified. In 2021 it obtained 8.5 million dollars in a funding round from Mundi Ventures, Ekarpen, Marcelo Gigliani of Apax Digital, and Alex Cruz of British Airways.

Products 
Its first product was a mobile phone application of the same name. Sherpa's products are predictive conversational digital assistants that learn from the user's context to anticipate their needs. They use 100,000 parameters from each user to answer requests. Also, they have developed a multi-purpose recommendation system for news, music, and filtering important emails.

There are free applications for Smartphones and tablets (Sherpa Assistant and Sherpa News) with over three million downloads. It was also factory-preset on Samsung smartphones as the default digital assistant until the Korean company launched Bixby.

Focused on business services, its assistants and its operating system are embedded in cars, smartphones, home speakers or appliances. It has agreements with companies such as Porsche and Samsung.

Work team 
By 2018, Sherpa had 35 employees, most of whom were experts in artificial intelligence and many of them with PhDs in mathematics and other disciplines. According to the publication Innova Spain, Sherpa works with researchers and research centres at the universities of Granada, Deusto, the University of the Basque Country and Mondragón. Some of its advisors include Alex Cruz, president and CEO of British Airways, and Chris Shipley, who was considered the most influential woman in Silicon Valley according to the San Jose Business Journal.

Tom Gruber, co-founder and former CTO of Siri, joined Sherpa's working group in 2019. One year later, Joanna Hoffman, Steve Jobs' right-hand woman, joined as an advisor.

See also 

 Artificial intelligence

References

External links 

Official website

Spanish brands
AI accelerators
Virtual assistants
Technology companies established in 2012
Development software companies